The Vogues' Greatest Hits is an LP album by The Vogues, released by Reprise Records (RS 6371) in 1970, consisting of the group's charted hits from the Co & Ce and Reprise labels. For this collection, arranger Ernie Freeman wrote orchestral parts to overdub the original Co & Ce masters of "You're the One", "Five O'Clock World", and "Magic Town" since all the Reprise songs were orchestrated.

Three of the twelve tracks make their album debut in this compilation: "Magic Town", "Green Fields", and "See That Girl".

Track listing

1970 greatest hits albums
The Vogues albums
Reprise Records compilation albums